Amata Inès Giramata (born 29 January 1996), is a Rwandan poet, blogger, feminist and community organizer.  She is the founder and chief executive of Sistah Circle, "a black feminist and womanist grass roots community dedicated to black women's lives and narratives told through radical love and storytelling", as described by Giramata, herself.

Background and education
Giramata was born in Rwanda on 29 January 1996. She is the first born in a family of four sisters and one brother. She attended La Colombiere School for her primary school training. She then transferred to Uganda, joining St. Mary's College Kitende, in Wakiso District. She completed her high school education at Green Hills Academy, in Kigali, Rwanda's capital city, in May 2013. She joined DePauw University, in the American state of Indiana, later the same year.

In 2017, she graduated from DePauw University with a Bachelor of Arts in Development Economics and Policy, Gender, Women and Sexuality Studies. As of August 2019, Giramata is pursuing a Doctor of Philosophy in Gender and Women's Studies from the University of Arizona in the United States.

Career
Despite her young age, Giramata's public performing experience stretches back to 2014, at the age of 18 years when she performed at the 20th Commemoration of the 1994 Genocide Against the Tutsi in Washington DC, in the United States and at the 20th Liberation Day at Amahoro Stadium, in Kigali, Rwanda, in 2014. She also performed at the 2015 Rwanda Day in Atlanta, Georgia, United States. On 4 July 2019, she was the lead spoken word performer at the 25th Liberation Day Celebrations at Amahoro Stadium, in Kigali.

Publications
 Journey of a 21st Century Queen As of 20 March 2019.

See also
 List of Rwandan writers

References

External links
 Giramata On Her Budding Career As A Poet
 At Age 23, Giramata (Class of 2017), "Is Considered One of The Lading Poets" In Rwanda

Living people
1996 births
Rwandan businesspeople
Rwandan women in business
Rwandan poets
Rwandan women poets
Rwandan women's rights activists
Women activists
DePauw University alumni
University of Arizona alumni
21st-century poets
People from Kigali
21st-century women writers
21st-century Rwandan women